Tobias MacDonald Jesso Jr. (born July 11, 1985) is a Canadian musician from North Vancouver, British Columbia. His debut album Goon was released in 2015 on True Panther Sounds. He was included in Rolling Stone magazine's list of the 20 Biggest Breakouts of 2015. He won the first ever Grammy Award for Songwriter of the Year at the 65th Annual Grammy Awards for his work on releases by Harry Styles, Adele, FKA Twigs, Orville Peck, King Princess, Diplo and Omar Apollo.

Career
After living and playing bass in Los Angeles for 4 years, Jesso moved back to his home in North Vancouver. He started playing the piano in his spare time while working for a moving company. It was during this period that he wrote his first piano-based song "Just a Dream." Eventually, he sent one of his demos in an email to former Girls bassist JR White. Jesso co-wrote the songs "When We Were Young" and "Lay Me Down" (featured on the Target version of 25) with Adele, which is included in her 2015 album 25.

Goon
Jesso's first demo was released in August 2013 after a painful break-up and his mother's cancer diagnosis. JR White, along with Patrick Carney of The Black Keys, John Collins of The New Pornographers, and Ariel Rechtshaid, helped produce Jesso's debut album entitled Goon. Aaron Sperske plays drums on the album except Danielle Haim plays drums on the track "Without You." His song "How Could You Babe" garnered increased attention after being tweeted about by both Adele and Alana Haim. He collaborated with Sia and Adele on the song "Alive". Originally intended for Adele and Rihanna, the song was eventually recorded by Sia and appeared on her album This Is Acting. His first major tour started in 2015.

Musical style
Jesso's music has been compared to singer/songwriters of the 1960s and 1970s from Randy Newman to Harry Nilsson and Emitt Rhodes. He cites Newman as one of his favourite artists. Even though he was a bassist and guitarist for years, his new music was written by him on the piano—an instrument he started playing at the age of 27.

Awards
Jesso was nominated for Songwriter of the Year at the 2015 Juno Awards. 
On June 20, 2016, Jesso was the recipient of the SOCAN Breakout Award at the SOCAN Awards in Toronto. He won the Grammy for Songwriter of the Year non-classical in 2023.

Personal life 
Jesso married Australian musician Emma Louise in January 2019; they have since had a child.

Discography

Singles 
 "True Love"
 "Hollywood"
 "How Could You Babe"

Songwriting and production credits

References

External links 
 

1985 births
Living people
Canadian male singer-songwriters
Musicians from British Columbia
Canadian people of Portuguese descent
21st-century Canadian male singers
21st-century Canadian guitarists
21st-century Canadian bass guitarists
21st-century Canadian pianists
Canadian indie rock musicians
Canadian indie pop musicians
Canadian songwriters
Grammy Award winners